Amir Ullah Khan is a professional economist and Professor who has worked on development issues primarily in the Health, education and agriculture sectors. Dr Khan has worked for the Ministry of Finance, Government of India and the UNDP at Project LARGE (Legal Adjustments and Reforms for Globalising the Economy). He is a former Deputy Director and policy advisor to the Bill and Melinda Gates Foundation. Prof Khan writes a regular column for the business news publication livemint.com and for the newspaper etemaaddaily.com He is also Visiting Professor at the Indian School of Business and at NALSAR in Hyderabad.

Khan is currently a member of the Board of Governors at the Digital Empowerment Foundation, GyanShaala and the Welham Girls School. He has been on the Governing board of the Presidency University, Bangalore. He was also a member in the Telangana Government's Commission of Inquiry on Socio economic conditions headed by G Sudhir. Prof Khan edits Sage's journal of Development Policy and Practice with Dr Bobby John. He has been Founder Vice Chancellor at the Glocal University in Saharanpur, Executive Director and Editor at Encyclopædia Britannica, Senior fellow and Director at the India Development Foundation and Adjunct Professor of Business and Law at the Edith Cowan University. Amir teaches at the Manipal Institute of Technology, the Indian Institute of Foreign Trade in Delhi.

Khan has been guest faculty at the Foreign Service Institute, Ministry of External Affairs, Infinity Business School  and Fore School of Management in New Delhi. He has worked on various research projects for the European Commission, National Council for Applied Economic Research, Planning Commission, Confederation of Indian Industry and the World Bank and has written on Economics and policy issues. He joined the Indian Civil Service and belongs to the 1993 batch and the 59th Foundation Course at LBSNAA. Now he is a guest faculty at Jadcherla's prestigious B- school NMIMS Hyderabad. Amir Ullah Khan studied at  The Hyderabad Public School, Ramanthapur. then at University College of Engineering, Osmania University and went on to study rural management at the Institute of Rural Management Anand. Khan then received his PhD from the Jamia Millia Islamia. 

Dr. Khan gave a lecture at the US-India Policy Institute in Washington, DC, on "Indian Economic Growth Patterns, Impact on Poverty and Sustainable Global Partnerships". On February 25, 2013 he gave a lecture at the Harvard University's School of Public Health as part of its Global Health Seminar series, on the Indian growth story and the impact on the health and other development sectors. He has worked on Education and Health Policy with the NITI Aayog. and edited a volume on the same subject. 

Dr. Khan is a Founder Trustee at the E and H foundation, whose mission is enabling education and health for underprivileged children.

He is also the director of Policy Talks (POLEDU LEARNING FOUNDATION), a Section 8 company that promotes public policy education particularly to school students.

Publications
 how india must tackle china's killer bug
Education and Health: Special focus on Uttar Pradesh, with Rajiv Kumar, Global University Press, 2014
Common Property Resource management: A focus on Forestry, with Mousumi Majumdar, Academic Foundation, 2011
The WTO deadlocked: Understanding the dynamics of International Trade, with Debashis Chakraborty, Sage, June 2008
States of the Indian Economy, with Harsh Vivek, Sage, November 2007
Agri Business and the Small Farmer, Edited, Angus and Grapher, January 2006
India Pakistan Trade: Towards a prosperous South Asia, CII and IDF, October 2005
Intellectual Property Rights, Beyond 2005, with Bibek Debroy, DC Books, December 2004
Integrating the Rural poor into Markets, edited with Bibek Debroy, Academic Foundation, New Delhi, 2004
Enabling Agricultural markets for the small Indian farmer, edited with Bibek Debroy, Bookwell, New Delhi, 2003
Identification of Bottlenecks in the Judicial Procedure with Pushpa Sharma and Aparna Rajagopal, Allied Publishers Limited New Delhi; 1997

References

20th-century Indian economists
Indian Muslims
Living people
Year of birth missing (living people)